Ray Sines was a member of the Ohio House of Representatives. He served from 1989 to 1996.

External links

Republican Party members of the Ohio House of Representatives
Living people
Year of birth missing (living people)
Place of birth missing (living people)